Nick Haynes (born 18 May 1992) is a professional Australian rules footballer playing for the Greater Western Sydney Giants in the Australian Football League (AFL). He was recruited by the club in the 2011 national draft with pick seven. Haynes made his debut in round 10, 2012, against  at Kardinia Park. He is known as one of the Giants inaugural players from their first season.

Early life
Nick Haynes grew up in Somerville and as a kid was once ranked amongst the best showboaters in Victoria.

AFL career
When Haynes was selected by GWS with pick seven in the 2011 AFL draft, he was an overage player without a solid position. Having grown significantly in the 18 months before he heard his name called, Haynes was seen as a midfielder who could float forward — with nothing about his potential as a defender. In 2019 Haynes was selected in the squad of 40 for the Virgin All Australian team after a breakout season with the giants. looking to build of that in the 2020 season was made difficult by the events taking place across the globe. However, Haynes made it work in a different season. Entering his ninth year in the league, the converted forward/midfielder was seen by many as the best intercepting defender in the game. He was an All Australian and won the giants best and fairest to cap of a spectacular individual season.

Currently, Haynes sits atop the defenders' version of the Coleman Medal — the intercept mark leaderboard.

Statistics
 Statistics are correct the end of  the 2020 season 

|- style="background:#eaeaea;"
! scope="row" style="text-align:center" | 2012
|style="text-align:center;"|
| 19 || 8 || 1 || 1 || 44 || 34 || 78 || 22 || 17 || 0.1 || 0.1 || 5.5 || 4.3 || 9.8 || 2.8 || 2.1|| 0
|-
! scope="row" style="text-align:center" | 2013
|style="text-align:center;"|
| 19 || 11 || 0 || 0 || 94 || 46 || 140 || 60 || 26 || 0 || 0 || 8.6 || 4.2 || 12.7 || 5.5 || 2.4|| 0
|- style="background:#eaeaea;"
! scope="row" style="text-align:center" | 2014
|style="text-align:center;"|
| 19 || 8 || 1 || 0 || 93 || 34 || 127 || 35 || 11 || 0.1 || 0 || 11.6 || 4.3 || 15.9 || 4.4 || 1.4|| 0
|-
! scope="row" style="text-align:center" | 2015
|style="text-align:center;"|
| 19 || 17 || 2 || 1 || 160 || 81 || 241 || 91 || 22 || 0.1 || 0.1 || 9.4 || 4.8 || 14.2 || 5.4 || 1.3|| 0
|- style="background:#eaeaea;"
! scope="row" style="text-align:center" | 2016
|style="text-align:center;"|
| 19 || 18 || 2 || 1 || 214 || 104 || 318 || 122 || 30 || 0.1 || 0.1 || 11.9 || 5.8 || 17.7 || 6.8 || 1.7|| 0
|- 
! scope="row" style="text-align:center" | 2017
|style="text-align:center;"|
| 19 || 19 || 2 || 2 || 227 || 108 || 335 || 115 || 29 || 0.1 || 0.1 || 12.0 || 5.7 || 17.6 || 6.1 || 1.5|| 0
|- style="background:#eaeaea;"
! scope="row" style="text-align:center" | 2018
|style="text-align:center;"|
| 19 || 24 || 0 || 0 || 297 || 120 || 417 || 150 || 41 || 0 || 0 || 12.4 || 5.0 || 17.4 || 6.3 || 1.7|| 5
|- 
! scope="row" style="text-align:center" | 2019
|style="text-align:center;"|
| 19 || 23 || 1 || 3 || 318 || 114 || 432 || 181 || 35 || 0 || 0.1 || 13.8 || 5.0 || 18.8 || 7.9 || 1.5|| 5
|- class="sortbottom"
|- style="background:#eaeaea;"
! scope="row" style="text-align:center" | 2020
|style="text-align:center;"|
| 19 || 17 || 0 || 0 || 208 || 64 || 272 || 121 || 23 || 0 || 0 || 12.2 || 3.8 || 16.0 || bgcolor=CAE1FF | 7.1† || 1.6 || 4
|- class="sortbottom"
! colspan=3| Career
! 145
! 9
! 8
! 1655
! 705
! 2360
! 897
! 234
! 0.1
! 0.1
! 11.4
! 4.9
! 16.3
! 6.2
! 1.4
! 14
|}

Notes

References

External links

1992 births
Living people
Greater Western Sydney Giants players
Australian rules footballers from Victoria (Australia)
Dandenong Stingrays players
All-Australians (AFL)